Vasile Bichea (born 18 November 1950) is a Romanian middle-distance runner. He competed in the men's 3000 metres steeplechase at the 1980 Summer Olympics.

References

1950 births
Living people
Athletes (track and field) at the 1980 Summer Olympics
Romanian male middle-distance runners
Romanian male steeplechase runners
Olympic athletes of Romania
Place of birth missing (living people)